Maja Maraš (born 1991 in Cetinje, Yugoslavia) is beauty pageant contestant who won Miss Montenegro 2011.  She will represent her country in Miss World 2011 in London, England.

References

External links
 Miss World 2011 

1991 births
Living people
Miss World 2011 delegates
Montenegrin beauty pageant winners